Stefan Kwiatkowski was a Polish commander of the Polish–Soviet War and a recipient of the Silver Cross of the Virtuti Militari.

Biography
He was born on 8 November 1894 in Korelicze, Grodno , in the family of Wacław. In 1915 he graduated from the Kiev River School, then he attended the Junkier School, which he did not graduate. In 1918, he was part of the Polish I Corps in Russia, commanded by General Józef Dowbor-Muśnicki and was a standard-bearer of the First .

In 1919 he joined the emerging Polish Navy as a second lieutenant. He took part in the Polish–Soviet War, initially as a liaison officer of the Riverine Flotilla of the Polish Navy from 24 March 1920 as the commander of the captured transport ship ORP Ataman, on which he participated in the clash near Łomczewo. Later he commanded the tug Champion, which he sank during the retreat on 21 July near Kaczanowicze. From August 1920, he commanded the armed ship  in the Riverine Flotilla. On 30 August 1920 he was decorated by General Józef Haller for participating in the Battle of Warsaw With the Silver Cross of the Order of the Virtuti Militari. The ID of the Cross was made on a piece of printed paper. In 1921 he commanded the armed ship ORP Warneńczyk.

In 1922, he was verified as a naval lieutenant with seniority on 1 June 1919. In the years 1928–1930, he was a navigation officer and then the deputy commander of the training sailing ship  during three consecutive training voyages, including to Cuba and the United States. In 1929, he was promoted to the rank of naval captain. Later, until 1933, he was the deputy commander of the destroyer . He participated in a cruise to Madeira after Marshal Józef Piłsudski and the Danzig crisis. On 1 January 1935 he was promoted to the rank of second lieutenant commander. From May 1936 to May 1937, he commanded  until March 1939 where he served in the Fleet Command.
On 1 April 1939 he became the commander of the minelayer . On 1 September, during the execution of the Operation Rurka, the ship was attacked in the Gdańsk Bank by Ju 87 dive bombers. Stefan Kwiatkowski was fatally wounded by a fragment of one of the bombs that exploded at the side. He was buried in the cemetery in Hel.

Awards
Virtuti Militari, SIlver Cross (1921, No. 3942)
Cross of Valour
Cross of Merit

References

1894 births
1939 deaths
People from Karelichy
Polish Navy officers
Polish military personnel of World War II
Polish military personnel killed in World War II
Polish people of the Polish–Soviet War
Recipients of the Cross of Merit (Poland)
Russian military personnel of World War I
Polish people of World War I
Deaths by airstrike during World War II